Canadian Unitarians for Social Justice (CUSJ), established in 1996, is a Canadian Unitarian Universalist social justice organization that is an associate member of the Canadian Unitarian Council. The organization publishes quarterly issues of JUSTnews and quarterly discussion papers each year.

References

External links
 

Unitarian Universalism in Canada
Unitarian Universalist organizations
Religious organizations established in 1996
Religious organizations based in Canada
Human rights organizations based in Canada
Social justice organizations
1996 establishments in Canada